Leon Hardeman (June 6, 1932 – December 9, 2019) was an American football player. Hardeman played college football at the halfback position for the Georgia Tech Yellow Jackets football team from 1951 to 1953. At five feet, six inches and 175 pounds, Hardeman was known for his "squat, wiry" running style.

Career 
Hardeman  was selected by the All-America Board, the International News Service and the Sporting News as a first-team player on their respective 1952 College Football All-America Teams. He was chosen by the United Press as a third-team player in 1953.

Hardeman was inducted into the Hall of Fame in the City of Chattanooga, Baylor School, Georgia Tech and the state of Georgia.

The number 50 jersey was retired at LaFayette High School in his honor.

References

1932 births
2019 deaths
People from Fort Payne, Alabama
American football halfbacks
Georgia Tech Yellow Jackets football players
Players of American football from Alabama
Players of American football from Georgia (U.S. state)
Military personnel from Alabama
Military personnel from Georgia (U.S. state)
United States Army officers